Deborah Kahn-Harris is the Principal of Leo Baeck College, a rabbinical seminary and centre for the training of teachers in Jewish education, based at the Sternberg Centre, Finchley, in the London Borough of Barnet. She was appointed to the post in September 2011.  Kahn-Harris, a graduate of the college, is one of the first woman rabbis to lead a mainstream rabbinic seminary.

Early life and education
Kahn-Harris was brought up in Houston, Texas, United States. She has a Bachelor of Arts degree in Art History from Mount Holyoke College, Massachusetts and a doctorate in biblical studies from the University of Sheffield.

Career 
Kahn-Harris was one of the members of the rabbinic staff at Sha'arei Tsedek/North London Reform Synagogue before her appointment to Leo Baeck College. She was also a lecturer at LBC.

Personal life
She has both American and British citizenship and is married to the writer, lecturer, and music critic Keith Kahn-Harris, with whom she has two children.

Publications
"Midrash for the Masses: The Uses (and Abuses) of the Term ‘Midrash’ in Contemporary Feminist Discourse" in Feminist Theology, May 2013, vol. 21 no. 3, pp. 295-308
"Weaning: Personal and Biblical Reflections" in Grushcow, Lisa J (ed): The Sacred Encounter: Jewish Perspectives on Sexuality, Central Conference of American Rabbis, 2014

References

External links
Leo Baeck College profile: Deborah Kahn-Harris
Oxford Centre for Hebrew and Jewish Studies: Deborah Kahn-Harris
Open University video interview: Rabbi Dr Deborah Kahn-Harris, 2012
Dresden lecture on Theodicy by Rabbi Deborah Kahn-Harris, Principal Leo Baeck College, London, European Union for Progressive Judaism (EUPJ) Biennial, 27 May 2014

Year of birth missing (living people)
Living people
21st-century English rabbis
Alumni of Leo Baeck College
Alumni of the University of Sheffield
British Reform rabbis
Educators from Texas
American women educators
Mount Holyoke College alumni
People associated with Leo Baeck College
People from Houston
Reform women rabbis
21st-century American women